Vic-sur-Aisne (literally "Vic on Aisne") is a commune in the Aisne department in Hauts-de-France in northern France, approximately 100 kilometres northeast of Paris.

Population

See also
Communes of the Aisne department

References

Communes of Aisne
Aisne communes articles needing translation from French Wikipedia